This is the complete discography of Ukrainian rock band Vopli Vidopliassova.

Studio albums 
 1994 - Kraina Mriy
 1997 - Muzika
 2000 - Hvyli Amura
 2002 - Fayno
 2006 - Buly denky
 2013 - Chudovy svit

Live albums 
 1992 - Abo abo
 1995 - Zakustyka
 2008 - 
 2008 -  (2CD collectors edition, full performance)

Singles 
 1996 - Muzika
 1998 - Lyubov
 2001 - Den NaroDJennya
 2001 - Mamay
 2008 - Gimn-Slaven Ukraini
 2008 - Lado (virtual single)
 2009 - Lado (maxi-single)
 2009 - Chio Chio San
 2010 - Vidpustka

Unofficial releases 
 1987 - Hai zhyve VV!
 1988 - Pershyy koncert v Moskvi
 1989 - Zv'yazok
 1989 - Tantsi
 1991 - Hey, O.K
 1995 - Zhittya v Bordo
 1996 - Salzburg
 1998 - ArhiVV 1988-1998
 1998 - Nenovye russkie (pesni) 1986-1994

DVDs 
 2007 - Video Collection
 2008 - Video Collection (collectors edition)
 2011 -

Compilations 
 2004 - Naikrashche
 2007 - Zbirka Etnichna
 2007 - Zbirka Rokova
 2007 - Zbirka Romantichna
 2007 - Zbirka Tantsyuvalna
 2012 -

Participation in collections
Budzma! Tuzin. Perazagruzka-2 (2011), track “Краіна мрой”

Music videos 
 1989 - Tantsi
 1989 - Zv'yazok
 1989 - 
 1993 - 
 1996 - Muzika
 1997 - Vesna
 1998 - Lyubov
 2000 - 
 2000 - Buli na seli
 2001 - Ne dumai
 2001 -  (DJ O'Skrypka Remix)
 2002 - Svit
 2002 - Polonina
 2003 - 
 2003 - 
 2006 - Pisenka
 2006 - Koliskova
 2006 - Katerina
 2009 - Lado
 2009 - Chio San
 2010 - Vidpustka
 2012 - Shchedryk
 2012 - Carol of the Bells

Vinyl releases 
 1993 - Abo abo
 2008 - Buli denki
 2012 - 
 2013 -  (1997 remix)
 2013 - Muzika
 2013 - Hvyli Amura

Discographies of Ukrainian artists